Home Oil Distributors Ltd v British Columbia (AG) [1940] S.C.R. 444 was a leading constitutional decision of the Supreme Court of Canada on the Trade and Commerce power under section 91(2) of the Constitution Act, 1867. The Court struck down the federal Coal and Petroleum Products Control Board Act, which protected the provincial market from rising gas prices, as it did not sufficiently conform to the "inter-provincial branch" of the Trade and Commerce power.
The Court found that where regulation over transactions that take place entirely within a province, even when the product has been imported, does not fall within the Trade and Commerce power and instead is a matter in the exclusive jurisdiction of the provincial government.

See also
 List of Supreme Court of Canada cases (Richards Court through Fauteux Court)

Canadian constitutional case law
Canadian federalism case law
Supreme Court of Canada cases
Supreme Court of Canada case articles without infoboxes
1940 in Canadian case law